"This Side of Goodbye" is a song written by Scott "Cactus" Moser, Jeff Pennig, and Michael Noble, and recorded by American country music group Highway 101.  It was released in May 1990 as the third single from the album Paint the Town.  The song reached #11 on the Billboard Hot Country Singles & Tracks chart.

Chart performance

References

1990 singles
Highway 101 songs
Song recordings produced by Paul Worley
Warner Records singles
1989 songs
Songs written by Jeff Pennig